Ben McLachlan and Jan-Lennard Struff were the defending champions, but Struff chose not to participate.

McLachlan played alongside Luke Bambridge and successfully defended the title, defeating Marcus Daniell and Philipp Oswald in the final, 7–6(7–3), 6–3.

Seeds

Draw

Draw

References

External links
 Main Draw

ASB Classic - Men's Doubles
2020 Doubles
ASB